Azov-Syvash National Nature Park is a national park of Ukraine, located on Byriuchyi Island in the northwestern Sea of Azov. The park was created to protect the unique coastal environment of the north-western Azov. It is particularly important as a stop on the flyway for migratory birds, with over a million birds visiting each year. It is located in Henichesk Raion of Kherson Oblast.

Topography
There are two separate areas in the park: 
 Azov Site: Byriuchyi Island in the Azov Sea (about 7,700 hectares).  The island is in fact connected to land by the narrow Fedotova Spit. The terrain is mostly sand-end-shells estuary plains.
 Syvash Site:  The waters and islands of the marine estuary stretching inland along the lagoon-like Syvash Bay (37,785 hectares).

Climate and ecoregion
The park is in the Pontic–Caspian steppe ecoregion.

Precipitation is among the lowest in Ukraine, with an average of 260 mm/year.

Flora and fauna

The Syvash sector has a dry-steppe environment, with poor soils, and brackish vegetation.  The islands in the bay have remained relatively isolated and exhibit more representative southern steppe habitats. Reed beds line portions of the Syvash sector.  The Azov site is an important resting spot for migratory birds.  The Central Syvash portion of the park is a Ramsar wetland of international importance. The site is also part of an Important Bird and Biodiversity Area (IBA) listed by Birdlife International.

Florɑ
In such climatic and soil conditions on Syvashy relatively poor desert steppe and saline vegetation with the corresponding steppe fauna is formed. More favorable environmental conditions on the island. Biryuchy, where the real southern steppes are widespread, and along the Utlyutsky estuary – reed thickets.

On the protected islands of Central Syvash – Churyuk and Kuyuk-Tuk – which were less affected by anthropogenic impact, true steppe phytocenoses have been preserved.

Fauna

This bay is a particularly valuable land for wetland birds in winter. More than 1 million birds (swallows, ducks, marsh terns, waders, mute swans, shelducks, herons, etc.) are registered in seasonal clusters during the year; including rare, vulnerable and endangered species listed in the Red Book of Ukraine, such as kentish plover, black-winged stilt, eurasian oystercatcher, white-headed duck, Pallas's gull and white-tailed eagle. Nearby in the steppes of Prysyvashshya the great bustard, the little bustard, the Demoiselle crane and common crane, the hen harrier, the pallid harrier, golden eagle, greater spotted eagle, saker falcon, peregrine falcon, lesser kestrel. A total of 30 species of "Red Book" birds have been registered in the park. Of these, the white-tailed eagle and the little bustard are also included in the European Red List. More than 1% of individuals of red-breasted goose and Greylag goose populations that overwinter here can live in the lands. A total of 197 bird species have been registered in the park.

Steppe grasses contributed to the formation of large populations of acclimatized animals. Acclimatization work began in 1928. The maximum number of red deer (830 heads) was observed here in 1992, fallow deer (1425 heads) in 1991, mouflon  (987 heads) 1992, onager  (37 heads) 1994. Of the hunting birds, the common pheasant is acclimatized here, the number of which periodically reaches several hundred. In addition, the Byriuchyi Island has created favourable conditions for the existence of aboriginal species of fauna, such as the grey hare, fox and acclimatized raccoon dog. The number of these animals, given the tense epidemiological situation in the region, has to be constantly regulated.

In total, there are more than 5,000 species of animals within the park, including 250 species of vertebrates. Amphibians often include the green toad and the marsh frog, among the reptiles there are numerous sand lizards, multi-colored lizards, grass snakes and dice snakes. Of the 26 registered in park waters of fish species of commercial value are European flounders and kalkan, marbled goby, Caucasian dwarf goby, russian sturgeon, stellate sturgeon, as well as the recently acclimatized in the Sea of Azov so-iuy mullet.

The park also protects many species of animals listed in the Red Book of Ukraine: great jerboa, steppe polecat, azov dolphin, four-striped and yellow -bellied slugs, smooth snake, Vipera renardi, as well as two species of hydroid polyps, one species of ringworm and 5 crustaceans insect species: empusa pennicornis, iris plyamystokrylyy, wasp road, Cryptocheilus rubellus, dauber, Stizus fasciatus wasp, white leucomigus.

In total, 250 species of vertebrades live on the territory of the Azov-Syvash National Nature Park, 48 of them are listed in the Red Book of Ukraine.

Public use
As a national park, Azov-Syvash is divided into four use-specific zones, providing for a protected area (38,970 hectares in Central Syvash), a regulated recreation zone (618 ha), a local recreation area (93 ha), and an 'economic zone' (12,473 ha).

References

External links

 Borders of Azov-Syvash National Park on OpenStreetMap.org
 Borders of Azov-Syvash National Park on ProtectedPlanet.net

Kherson Oblast
National parks of Ukraine
Protected areas of Ukraine